This list includes the all-time and the active consecutive NFL playoff appearances. Aside from the NFL playoff appearance streaks, this list also includes Championship Game appearance streaks and the NFL championships win streak. Streaks from the AFL are also included.

The New England Patriots held the longest consecutive playoff streak with 11 appearances from 2009 to 2019, which is the longest of all-time. The Patriots won three Super Bowls during this streak. The Dallas Cowboys hold the second consecutive playoff appearances record with nine appearances from 1975–1983. The Cowboys won one NFL championship during the streak. The Indianapolis Colts tied this record with nine straight appearances and one championship from 2002–2010. The Green Bay Packers hold the longest consecutive NFL title streak with three consecutive crowns. They did this once in the 1920s, before playoff games, and once in the 1960s, by winning seven playoff games during this three year championship streak.

The Patriots hold the record for most consecutive playoff games won. From 2001–2005, New England won 10 games in a row, including 3 Super Bowls. The Packers previously held the record for most consecutive playoff games won with 9. Dallas, Pittsburgh, Denver and San Francisco all have 7 game winning streaks.

Active streaks

NFL Playoffs appearance streaks

 Bold italics including longest streak indicates that the streak is also the team's longest-ever streak for consecutive playoff seasons.

Breakdown by division

NFL Playoffs win streaks

All-time streaks

Longest consecutive playoff appearance streak
Streaks can be verified at Pro Football Reference.com Team Franchise Pages

Timeline for each teams' longest streak. 

{|class="wikitable" style="text-align:center"
! colspan="30"  style="width:95%; text-align:center; font-size:125%; background:#deb887;"| Teams' longest consecutive playoff appearances all time
|- style="background:#f0f0f0;"
| colspan="4"  style="width:16%; border-right:2px solid blue;"|1990s
| colspan="10"  style="width:16%; border-right:2px solid blue;"|2000s
| colspan="10" style="width:8%; border-right:2px solid blue;"|2010s
| colspan="6" style="width:8%;"|2020s
|- style="background:#f0f0f0;"
|width=2%|6||width=2%|7||width=2%|8|| style="width:2%; border-right:2px solid blue;"|9
|width=2%|0||width=2%|1||width=2%|2||width=2%|3||width=2%|4||width=2%|5||width=2%|6||width=2%|7||width=2%|8|| style="width:2%; border-right:2px solid blue;"|9
|width=2%|0||width=2%|1||width=2%|2||width=2%|3||width=2%|4||width=2%|5||width=2%|6||width=2%|7||width=2%|8|| style="width:2%; border-right:2px solid blue;"|9
|width=2%|0||width=2%|1||width=2%|2||width=2%|3||width=2%|4||width=2%|5
|- style="background:#e0e0e0;"
|colspan= 6 | || colspan="9" style="background:#003b7b"|Indianapolis Colts 9 ||colspan="5" style="border:3px solid #000000;background:#FB4F14;color: black"| Cincinnati Bengals 5||colspan="10"|
|- style="background:#e0e0e0;"
|colspan=4 style="border: 3px solid #E5B73B;background:#00827F;" |Jacksonville Jaguars 4|| colspan="5" style="border: 3px solid silver;background:#003b48"|Philadelphia Eagles 5 ||colspan=4 style="border: 3px solid red;background:#192f6b;" | New York Giants 4||colspan="8" style="border: 3px solid #FFEF00;background:#213D30" | Green Bay Packers 8||colspan=9 |
|- style="background:#e0e0e0;"
|colspan= 3| ||colspan=4 style="border: 3px solid #CCCCFF;background-color:#C41E3A" |Tampa Bay Bucs 4 || colspan="6"| || colspan="11" style="background:#192f6b;" |  New England Patriots 11 ||colspan= 6|
|- style="background:#e0e0e0;"
|colspan=10 | ||colspan=4 style="border: 3px solid #D4AF37;background:#062A78;"| San Diego Chargers 4|| colspan=5|  || colspan="8" style="background:#cfecec;"|'Kansas City Chiefs 8||colspan=3| 
|- style="background:#e0e0e0;"
| || colspan="5" style="border: 3px solid #FF7F00;background:#00A693"|Miami Dolphins 5|| colspan="6"| || colspan="5" style="background:#200080;" |Baltimore Ravens 5 || style=";" colspan=3 |Carolina Panthers 3||colspan=10|
|- style="background:#e0e0e0;"
| colspan=5|  ||colspan=2 style="background:#0C371D" | NY Jets 2||colspan=6| ||colspan=2 style="background:#0C371D" | NY Jets 2 ||colspan=5 style="background:#FB4F14;color: black"| Denver Broncos 5 ||colspan=10|
|- style="background:#e0e0e0;"
|colspan=12 | ||colspan=2 style="background:#a02040" | Arizona Cards 2||colspan="3" style="border: 3px solid #000000;background-color: #c02020"|Atlanta Falcons 3 ||  ||colspan=2 style="background:#a02040" | Arizona Cards 2||colspan=10 |
|- style="background:#e0e0e0;"
|colspan= 7| ||  colspan="5"  style="border: 3px solid #69BE28;background-color:#002244" |Seattle Seahawks 5|| colspan=4 | || colspan="5"  style="background-color:#002244" |Seattle Seahawks 5|| colspan="4" style=";" |  New Orleans Saints 4   ||colspan= 5|
|- style="background:#e0e0e0;"
|colspan=15 |  ||colspan=2 style="border: 3px solid #191970;background:#C41E3A;color:white" |  Houston Texans 2 || colspan= 2| ||colspan=2 style="border: 3px solid #191970;background:#C41E3A;color:white" |  Houston Texans 2 ||colspan=1 | || colspan=2 style="border: 3px solid #191970;background:#C41E3A;color:white" |  Houston Texans 2  ||colspan= 6|
|}

Longest consecutive streak with a playoff win
Streaks can be verified at Pro Football Reference.com Team Franchise Pages

Timeline for each teams' longest streak. 

NFL / AFL Playoff appearance streaks

When sorting, the following are grouped together
Indianapolis and Baltimore Colts 
Los Angeles and St. Louis Rams 
Oakland and Los Angeles Raiders  
Houston Oilers and Tennessee Titans

 No NFL Divisions from 1950–1966. Browns were American Conference Champs 1950–1952 and Eastern Champs 1953–1955.
 No NFL Divisions from 1950–1966. Rams were the National Conference Champs in 1950 & 1951.
 Super Bowls did not determine AFL or NFL League Champion before 1970 merger. Green Bay won the NFL Championships and the Super Bowls in the 1966 and 1967 seasons.

Championship Game appearance streaks

Championships from 1920–1969 seasons.

Super Bowl appearance streaksAppearance streaks up through the end of the 2021 season.''

Championship Win Streaks
Championships from 1920–1969 seasons.

 
 NFL Champions were named from 1920 through 1932 by highest win percentage (ties not counted). There were no official playoff games till the 1933 season.
 The Bears were named the NFL Champions in 1932 after winning an unofficial playoff game played indoors due to extremely cold weather. The game is recorded as a regular season game that was needed to break a tie between the Bears and the Portsmouth Spartans (now the Detroit Lions).

Super Bowl Win Streaks

Historical team streaks

Most consecutive post-season wins in team history

This is a sortable table of all 32 current NFL teams. Twelve teams have multiple winning streaks where they won an equal number of post season games before a loss.

Updated through the 2021 season.

  Streak occurred when the team was the Baltimore Colts.
  Streak occurred when the team was the Oakland Raiders in 1980, and the Los Angeles Raiders in 1982.
  Streak occurred when the team was the San Diego Chargers.
  Streak occurred when the team was the Washington Redskins.

See also
List of current National Football League consecutive playoff appearances
List of last undefeated NFL teams by season
List of NFL franchise post-season droughts

References

NFL post-season streaks
Post-season streaks
Post-season streaks